The Pine Mill Bridge is an historic structure located in Wildcat Den State Park in rural Muscatine County, Iowa, United States. It was built in 1878 near the Pine Creek Gristmill, the only place in Iowa where a mill and bridge combination remains in place. The bridge was listed on the National Register of Historic Places in 1998 as a part of the Highway Bridges of Iowa MPS.

History
The citizens of Montpelier Township petitioned the Muscatine County Board of Supervisors in 1877 for a bridge over Pine Creek at the site of the mill where they needed a crossing to transport their crops. For most of the year the creek was easily crossed, but after a heavy rainfall it was turned into a raging stream. Financial considerations delayed the project for a year when the board solicited bids for the construction of the bridge. In September 1878 a contract to manufacture and erect the truss was issued to the Wrought Iron Bridge Company of Canton, Ohio. The bridge was completed by the end of the year. While it was one of numerous bridge and mill combinations across the state of Iowa, it is the only one that remains.

Design
The Pine Mill Bridge is a standard pin-connected Pratt through truss bridge offered by the Wrought Iron Bridge Company.

See also
List of bridges documented by the Historic American Engineering Record in Iowa

References

External links
Wildcat Den State Park documentary produced by Iowa Public Television

Bridges in Muscatine County, Iowa
Pedestrian bridges in Iowa
Truss bridges in Iowa
Bridges completed in 1878
Historic American Engineering Record in Iowa
Road bridges on the National Register of Historic Places in Iowa
National Register of Historic Places in Muscatine County, Iowa
Wrought iron bridges in the United States
Pratt truss bridges in the United States